Georges Goven (born 26 April 1948) is a retired tennis player from France.

Tennis career

Juniors
As a junior, he won the Australian Championships Boys' Singles title in 1964.

Amateur / Pro tour
Goven reached the semifinals in both singles and doubles (partnering François Jauffret) at the 1970 French Open.

He notably defeated Ilie Năstase (then world No. 7) in Paris in September 1977 with the help of the Spaghetti racket, and Vitas Gerulaitis (then world No. 5) in Florence in May 1983.

After retirement
Goven has coached such players as Nicolas Escudé, Nathalie Dechy and Tatiana Golovin. He was the Davis Cup team captain from 1993 to 1994. Currently, he is the captain of the France Fed Cup team since 2005 (replacing his compatriot and former player Guy Forget) and coaches Kristina Mladenovic.

Career finals

Doubles (1 title, 6 runner-ups)

References

External links
 
 
 
 ITF Coaching

1948 births
Living people
Australian Championships (tennis) junior champions
French male tennis players
French tennis coaches
Tennis players from Lyon
Grand Slam (tennis) champions in boys' singles